The following is a list of significant paintings by the Mexican artist, Frida Kahlo. It does not include drawings, studies, or watercolors.

 The authenticity of When I Have You, Life, How Much I Love You and How Beautiful Life is When It Gives Us Its Riches is disputed.

References

 
 Frida Kahlo Fans

Paintings by Frida Kahlo
Kahlo